The 2004 United States House of Representatives elections in South Carolina were held on November 2, 2004 to select six Representatives for two-year terms from the state of South Carolina.  The primary elections for the Democrats and the Republicans were held on June 8.  All five incumbents who ran were re-elected and the open seat in the 4th congressional district was retained by the Republicans.  The composition of the state delegation remained four Republicans and two Democrats.

Overview

District 1

Seeking his third term in this conservative, coastal South Carolina-based district, incumbent Republican Congressman Henry E. Brown, Jr. crushed Green Party candidate James Dunn to win another term.

District 2

Congressman Joe Wilson has represented this strongly conservative district that runs from the southern coast of South Carolina to the suburbs of Columbia since 2001. Running for his third term, Congressman Wilson faced off against Democratic candidate Michael Ellisor and Constitution Party candidate Steve Lefemine, whom he was able to defeat comfortably.

District 3

Freshman Republican Congressman J. Gresham Barrett faced no opposition in his bid for a second term in this western South Carolina district, the most conservative one in the state.

District 4

When incumbent Republican Congressman Jim DeMint decided to run for Senate instead of seeking a fourth term, former Republican Congressman Bob Inglis, who had previously represented this seat, defeated Democrat Brandon Brown and Green Party candidate Faye Walters to return to Congress for his fourth term.

District 5

Incumbent Democratic Congressman John Spratt has represented this conservative-leaning district for thirty-two years and ran for a twelfth term this year. Though President George W. Bush comfortably won this district in 2004, Spratt was able to handily defeat Republican Albert Spencer.

District 6

In a rematch from the 2002 election, incumbent Democratic Congressman Jim Clyburn, a member of the Democratic House leadership, encountered Republican opponent Gary McLeod, whom he defeated again this year by a similar margin from two years earlier.

See also
United States House of Representatives elections, 2004
United States Senate election in South Carolina, 2004
South Carolina's congressional districts

References

External links
South Carolina Election Returns

South Carolina
2004
2004 South Carolina elections